Hayden Lescault (born March 24, 1992) is an American professional basketball player for Lions de Genève of the Swiss Basketball League.

College career
As a senior at Point Loma in 2014-15 Lescault averaged 12.3 points, 3.9 rebounds and 3.6 assists in 31.8 minutes in 28 appearances.

Professional career
On May 18, 2019, Lescault was named Most Valuable Player of the Austrian Basketball Bundesliga's 2018–19 season.

On August 27, 2019, he signed with Macedonian club Rabotnički.

In January 2021, Lescault signed with Bosnian team Borac Banja Luka. He left after the end of the 2020–21 season.

References

External links
Eurobasket.com Profile
RealGM Profile

1992 births
Living people
American expatriate basketball people in Bosnia and Herzegovina
American expatriate basketball people in North Macedonia
American expatriate basketball people in Germany
American men's basketball players
Guards (basketball)
OKK Borac players
People from Folsom, California
KK Rabotnički players